The Fifth Monarchists, or Fifth Monarchy Men, were a Protestant sect which advocated Millennialist views, active during the 1649 to 1660 Commonwealth of England. Named after a prophecy in the Book of Daniel that Four Monarchies would precede the Fifth or establishment of the Kingdom of God on earth, the group was one of a number of Nonconformist sects that emerged during the Wars of the Three Kingdoms. Perhaps its best known member was Major-General Thomas Harrison, executed in October 1660 as a regicide, while Oliver Cromwell was a sympathiser until 1653. 

Members believed the execution of Charles I in January 1649 marked the end of the Fourth Monarchy and viewed both the institution of the Protectorate in 1653 and the 1660 Stuart Restoration as preventing the coming of the Fifth. The belief by some members that this justified military action meant they were actively persecuted by both regimes and never became a mass movement. Many of their remaining leaders were executed after participating in Venner's Rising of January 1661, and the group absorbed into other sects.

Beliefs
The Fifth Monarchists took their inspiration from the four kingdoms of Daniel which prophesied that the Fifth, or Kingdom of God, would be preceded by the Babylonian, Persian, Greek and Roman kingdoms. Followers believed the execution of Charles I in January 1649 marked the end of the Fourth or Roman Monarchy. Several became regicides in the belief his death would usher in the Kingdom of the Saints, or rule by those who were "saved", such as the Fifth Monarchists. The role of these so-called "Saints" was to prepare the masses for the Second Coming, although exactly when this would happen was debated. Based on the Book of Revelation, some believed Christ would return in 1666, which corresponded with the biblical number of the beast, while it was also common to refer to a "Thousand Years". 

Many supported "Antinomianism", a rejection of the legal system on the grounds that the "Saved" were not bound by the Ten Commandments, while they also believed it was their duty to resist any regime which hindered the coming of the Kingdom. Although the movement eventually split between those who opposed violence, the "suffering Saints", and the "insurrectionist Saints" like Thomas Venner who advocated taking up arms, these beliefs caused Oliver Cromwell and later contemporaries to see them as wild revolutionaries and enemies of the established order.

Origins and the Commonwealth

The outbreak of the Wars of the Three Kingdoms in 1639 led to an exponential increase in the dissemination of radical political and religious views, including Millennialist ideas. Although Millenarianism was common among Puritans and even shared by some Royalist members of the Church of England, Fifth Monarchists were unique in that the concept was central to their theology. In general, they also opposed Religious tolerance for non-Protestants, and unlike groups such as the Diggers had no desire to end the existing social order or extend political rights, since they argued only the "Saved" were worthy of power. Exceptions included the Levellers sympathiser Christopher Feake, and Mary Cary, who supported gender equality and measures to alleviate poverty; prior to her death in 1654, she wrote under the name "MC", and many assumed she was a man.  

The Fifth Monarchists began life as a faction of the religious Independents who dominated the post-1648 Rump Parliament, with close links to Baptists and Anabaptists. Their emergence as a separate sect is usually dated to December 1651, when a group of preachers including Feake, John Rogers, and John Simpson met in London. Disillusioned by the apparent failure of Parliament to further the "Godly Revolution", they agreed a programme of action to support their objectives, including active resistance to the Commonwealth government. 

Primarily recruited from the London Artisan class, the Fifth Monarchists attracted attention disproportionate to their actual numbers because these included senior officers of the New Model Army. Among them were Major Generals Thomas Harrison and Thomas Overton, along with Colonels Nathaniel Rich, John Jones Maesygarnedd and William Goffe, as well as senior administrators such as John Carew. Many others were initially sympathetic to their views, including Cromwell and Sir Henry Vane, and the highpoint of their political influence came in April 1653 when Cromwell dismissed the Rump Parliament, an action which led the Fifth Monarchists to hail him as a new Moses. 

They also supported his declaration of war on the Dutch Republic. Despite it being waged against fellow Protestants, the Monarchists argued that it was their duty to spread the Kingdom of the Saints to every country, whether Protestant or Catholic. . Cromwell replaced the Rump with a nominated body popularly known as "Barebone's Parliament"; out of 149 MPs, 15 can be identified as Fifth Monarchists, including Praise-God Barebone, Carew and Harrison. The inaugural session began in July 1653 but the different factions quickly became entangled in bitter disputes over tithes, which the Monarchists wanted to abolish rather than reduce, and reform of the legal system, which they argued should be based solely on laws contained in the Bible. On 8 December, the moderate majority passed a motion urging Cromwell to dissolve Parliament, leading to the establishment of the Protectorate on 16th. 

The result was open conflict between the regime and the Fifth Monarchists; Harrison, Overton and Rich were dismissed from the army, while Rogers and Feake attacked Cromwell for his Apostasy and preached revolt to their followers. This caused a split with elements of the movement like John Carew who held Baptist or Anabaptist views, notably their opposition to the use of violence. Rogers and Feake were arrested, while the government placed other members under surveillance and thereafter alternated persecution with tolerance in an attempt to split the movement. This policy had some success, with Rogers, Goffe, John Jones Maesygarnedd and the Welsh preacher Morgan Llwyd becoming reconciled with the regime, leaving a minority of insurrectionists like Venner who was imprisoned in 1657 for planning a rising. By the time he was released in 1659, the Monarchists had lost much of their influence and were no longer a significant force.

Restoration and after

Following the Stuart Restoration in May 1660, Harrison was the first person to be found guilty of regicide and then hanged, drawn and quartered on 13 October. One reason was his justification of violent action against "un-Godly rulers", which meant he was viewed as an ongoing threat to the re-established order. This seemed confirmed on 6 January 1661, when Venner tried to incite a popular uprising to capture London in the name of "King Jesus", with fifty followers based in Norton Folgate. 

Most were killed or taken prisoner, with Venner and ten others executed for high treason on 19 and 21 January, while its failure led to the suppression of Non-conformist sects, culminating in the Act of Uniformity 1662. Although the Great Plague of London and the Great Fire of London briefly revived belief in the end of a world ruled by carnal human beings, Fifth Monarchy ceased to exist as a separate sect, although some doctrines were absorbed by Baptists and others who believed "God's Kingdom" could be achieved through spiritual means.

Notable members and sympathisers
 Praise-God Barebone; gave his name to the 1653 Barebone's Parliament, arrested after the 1660 Restoration but later released and died in 1679; 
 John Carew; executed as a regicide in 1661;
 Mary Cary (prophetess); died  1654;
 Christopher Feake; a Fifth Monarchist who shared the egalitarian political views of the Levellers, he was arrested in 1655 under the Protectorate. Released after Cromwell's death in 1658, he disappears from the historical record after 1660; 
 Major General William Goffe; regicide, fled to New England in 1660, where he is thought to have died around 1679;
 
 Major-General Thomas Harrison; dismissed from the army in 1654 and imprisoned several times under the Protectorate, he was executed as a regicide in October 1660;
 Morgan Llwyd; leader of the Welsh Fifth Monarchists and Welsh language author, died 1659;
 John Jones Maesygarnedd; served in the Parliamentarian army in Wales during the First and Second English Civil Wars, continued to hold office under the Protectorate, executed as a regicide in October 1660; 
 Major-General Robert Overton; arrested several times during the Protectorate, imprisoned on the island of Jersey from 1661 to 1668, died at home in London 1679; 
 Major General William Packer; imprisoned briefly after the Restoration, died 1662;
 Vavasor Powell; Welsh preacher, imprisoned by both the Protectorate and the Stuart regime, died in prison 1670; 
 Colonel Thomas Rainsborough; often cited as a Fifth Monarchist, he was the leading Leveller spokesman during the 1647 Putney Debates, shared Anabaptist sympathies and died in 1648
 Colonel Nathaniel Rich; dismissed from the army along with Harrison and Overton, he was imprisoned under the Protectorate in 1655, then released in 1656. Since he was not a regicide, he escaped punishment after the Restoration, but was arrested during the Venner Rising and held until 1665, after which he lived quietly at home in Essex;  
 John Rogers; preacher, imprisoned under the Protectorate, went into exile in the Dutch Republic post 1660;
 John Simpson; London-based preacher
Anna Trapnell; religious visionary from Poplar, London, who opposed The Protectorate, and was considered mad for her advocacy of gender equality. Arrested in 1654, released in 1656, and thereafter disappears from the historical record; 
 Thomas Venner; leader of the "Fighting Saints", executed after an abortive rising in January 1661;

See also
 Fifth Empire, a Portuguese millennialist sect also inspired by the Four Kingdoms of Daniel

Notes

References

Sources

Further reading
 .
 .
 .
 .
 
 .
 .
 .
 .
 .
 .
 .
 .
 .

External links

 Fifth Monarchists or Fifth Monarchy Men
 The Times of Stephen MUMFORD. See the sections on "John James", "Efforts at Conformity" and "Fifth Monarchy Views".
 Some account of the life and opinions of a fifth-monarchy-man By John Rogers, Edward Rogers, Longmans, Green, Reader & Dyer, 1867

 
Apocalyptic groups
Christian radicalism
Puritanism in England